The Royal Film Performance is a trademarked event owned by The Film and Television Charity, formerly the Cinema & Television Benevolent Fund. The events showcases a major film premiere and is attended by members of the British Royal Family. The proceeds from the event enable the charity to offer financial support to people from the Film, TV & Cinema industries.

The event began in 1946, as the Royal Command Film Performance, with a screening of A Matter of Life and Death. The "Royal Command" name was changed in 1948. There was no performance between 2015 and 2019 while the Film and Television Charity was restructured.

The most recent Royal Film Performance was the UK premiere of Top Gun: Maverick at the ODEON Leicester Square on 19 May 2022. The event was attended by Prince William, and the Duchess of Cambridge.

History of events

References

External links
  
  
 

Film festivals in the United Kingdom
Charity events in the United Kingdom
British royalty
Film festivals established in 1946
1946 establishments in the United Kingdom
Fundraising events